I Gusti Putu Martha (1913–1992) was the third governor of the Indonesian island of Bali from 1965 until 1967.

External links
Bali World Statesmen

1913 births
Governors of Bali
Balinese people
Indonesian Hindus
1992 deaths